Allobaculum stercoricanis  is an anaerobic, non-spore-forming and rod-shaped bacterium from the genus of Allobaculum which has been isolated from feces from a dog.´

References

External links
Type strain of Allobaculum stercoricanis at BacDive -  the Bacterial Diversity Metadatabase	

Erysipelotrichia
Bacteria described in 2006